Borealis is an annually recurring Norwegian contemporary music festival located in Bergen since 2006.

The festival is a continuation of the earlier festivals Music Factory and Autunnale.

A large number of cultural institutions in Bergen are backing the festival and Hild Borchrevink is the festival's chair leader.

References

External links 
 

Music festivals in Norway
Recurring events established in 2006